Live 04 is a live album by German electronica duo Mouse on Mars. It was released on Sonig in 2005.

Critical reception
Heather Phares of AllMusic gave the album 4 stars out of 5, saying, "while it's still not quite the same as seeing Mouse on Mars in concert, that it manages to capture even a fraction of the atmosphere and sweat of their shows makes it potent stuff indeed." Mark Richardson of Pitchfork gave the album an 8.0 out of 10, describing it as "a soundtrack to a raucous little party."

Track listing

Personnel
Credits adapted from liner notes.

 Jan St. Werner – keyboards, electronics
 Andi Toma – bass guitar, electronics
 Dodo Nkishi – drums, vocals

References

External links
 
 

2005 live albums
Mouse on Mars albums